The 2008 Trofeo Federale was a four-team football tournament in San Marino running from 1 to 16 September 2008. The teams were 2007–08 league champions, Murata and runners-up, Juvenes/Dogana; since the 2007–08 Coppa Titano finalists were also the league finalists, the cup's semi-finalists, Tre Fiori and Faetano were used instead as the remaining two clubs.

Tournament bracket

Trofeo Federale
Trofeo